The Number is a 2017 South African drama film directed by Khalo Matabane. It was screened in the Contemporary World Cinema section at the 2017 Toronto International Film Festival.

Cast
 Presley Chweneyagae as China Boy
 Deon Lotz as Torrein
 Mothusi Magano as Magadien Wentzel
 Warren Masemola as Buttons

References

External links
 

2017 films
2017 drama films
South African drama films
Zulu-language films